Corbin Strong (born 30 April 2000) is a New Zealand road and track cyclist, who currently rides for UCI WorldTeam . He won the points race and finished second in the team pursuit at the 2020 UCI Track Cycling World Championships.

In 2018 Strong crashed into a stationary car while on a training ride, fracturing his T1 vertebra.

Major results
Sources:

Track

2016
 Oceania Junior Championships
2nd  Omnium
2nd  Team pursuit
3rd  Scratch
 3rd  Team pursuit, UCI World Junior Championships
2017
 2nd Madison, National Championships
2018
 1st  Team pursuit, UCI World Junior Championships
2019
 1st  Points, Oceania Championships
 National Championships
1st  Points
1st  Team pursuit
2nd Scratch
2nd Madison
2020
 UCI World Championships
1st  Points
2nd  Team pursuit
 National Championships
1st  Points
1st  Omnium
2021
 1st  Team pursuit, National Championships
 UCI Champions League
1st Elimination, Palma
1st Scratch, Palma
2nd Scratch, London
2022
 1st  Scratch, Commonwealth Games
 2nd  Elimination, UCI World Championships

Road

2018
 3rd Lake Taupo Cycle Challenge
2019
 1st  Points classification, Tour de Ijen
 4th Overall Tour de Kumano
1st  Young rider classification
 5th Overall Tour de Korea
1st  Young rider classification
 8th Overall Tour of Thailand
2020
 Tour of Southland
1st Stages 2 & 4
 3rd Overall New Zealand Cycle Classic
1st  Young rider classification
2021
 1st  Overall New Zealand Cycle Classic
1st  Young rider classification
1st Stage 1 (TTT)
 5th Gravel and Tar Classic
2022
 2nd Coppa Bernocchi
 5th Grand Prix de Wallonie
 6th Overall Tour of Britain
1st Stage 1
 7th Gran Piemonte
2023
 5th Cadel Evans Great Ocean Road Race
 9th La Drôme Classic

References

External links

2000 births
Living people
New Zealand male cyclists
Sportspeople from Invercargill
New Zealand track cyclists
UCI Track Cycling World Champions (men)
Olympic cyclists of New Zealand
Cyclists at the 2020 Summer Olympics
21st-century New Zealand people
Cyclists at the 2022 Commonwealth Games
Commonwealth Games competitors for New Zealand
Commonwealth Games gold medallists for New Zealand
Medallists at the 2022 Commonwealth Games